The Two domes of Kukherd in Kukherd , in ) are tombs that date from the time of early Afsharid Iran. The tombs were built between 1145 and 1151 AH (1732 to 1738 AD).

Because of the beauty of their decoration, the tombs have been a major attraction for visitors of Kukherd, the capital of Kukherd District, in Bastak County, Hormozgan Province, southern Iran.

History
The tombs were built between 1145 and 1151 AH (1732–1738 AD), during the early Afsharid period.

See also 
Bastak 
Paraw Kukherd 
The Historic Bath of Siba 
Castle of Siba

References 

 :ar: دوكنبدان Arabic Wikipedias.
 :fa: آرامگاه علمای کوخرد Persian Wikipedia.
	الكوخردى ، محمد ، بن يوسف، (كُوخِرد حَاضِرَة اِسلامِيةَ عَلي ضِفافِ نَهر مِهران) الطبعة الثالثة ،دبى: سنة 199۷ للميلاد **Mohammed Kookherdi (1997) Kookherd, an Islamic civil at Mehran river,  third edition: Dubai
	محمدیان، کوخری، محمد ، “ (به یاد کوخرد) “، ج1. ج2. چاپ اول، دبی: سال انتشار 2003 میلادی Mohammed Kookherdi Mohammadyan (2003), Beyade Kookherd, third edition : Dubai.
محمدیان، کوخردی ، محمد ،  «شهرستان بستک و بخش کوخرد»  ، ج۱. چاپ اول، دبی: سال انتشار ۲۰۰۵ میلادی Mohammed Kookherdi Mohammadyan (2005), Shahrestan  Bastak & Bakhshe Kookherd, First edition : Dubai.
عباسی ، قلی، مصطفی،  «بستک وجهانگیریه»، چاپ اول، تهران : ناشر: شرکت انتشارات جهان
   سلامى، بستكى، احمد.  (بستک در گذرگاه تاریخ)  ج2 چاپ اول، 1372 خورشيدى
 اطلس گیتاشناسی استان‌های ایران [Atlas Gitashenasi Ostanhai Iran] (Gitashenasi Province Atlas of Iran)
 درگاه فهرست آثار ملی ایران
 درگاه فهرست آثار ملی ایران
 فهرست آثار فرهنگی تاریخی ثبت شده در فهرست آثار ملی شهرستان بستک

External links 
 Kookherd website

Archaeological sites in Iran
Kukherd District
Bastak County
History of Hormozgan Province
Tombs in Iran
Buildings and structures in Kukherd District
Tourist attractions in Hormozgan Province